Maksym Oleksandrovych Smiyan (born 11 April 2002) is a Ukrainian professional footballer who plays as an attacking midfielder for Ukrainian Premier League club Zorya Luhansk.

Career
Smiyan is a product of the Youth Sportive School #15 Kyiv and Zorya Luhansk academies. He played initially for Zorya Luhansk in the Ukrainian Premier League Reserves. 

In October 2021 he was promoted to the senior squad, and was an unused substitution player in the winning Ukrainian Premier League match against Metalist 1925 Kharkiv on 31 October 2021. Smiyan made his debut for Zorya Luhansk only on 11 August 2022, playing as a first-time substitution player in a losing match against Romanian club Universitatea Craiova in the 2022–23 UEFA Europa Conference League third qualifying round.

Career statistics

Club

References

External links 
 
 

2002 births
Living people
Ukrainian footballers
Association football midfielders
FC Zorya Luhansk players
Ukrainian Premier League players